Estonia participated in the Eurovision Song Contest 2003 with the song "Eighties Coming Back" written by Vaiko Eplik. The song was performed by the band Ruffus. The Estonian broadcaster Eesti Televisioon (ETV) organised the national final Eurolaul 2003 in order to select the Estonian entry for the 2003 contest in Riga, Latvia. Ten songs competed in the national final and "Eighties Coming Back" performed by Claire's Birthday was selected as the winner by an international jury panel. The band was later renamed as Ruffus for the Eurovision Song Contest.

Estonia competed in the Eurovision Song Contest which took place on 24 May 2003. Performing during the show in position 17, Estonia placed twenty-first out of the 26 participating countries, scoring 14 points.

Background 

The Estonian national broadcaster, Eesti Televisioon (ETV), broadcasts the event within Estonia and organises the selection process for the nation's entry. Since their debut, the Estonian broadcaster has organised national finals that feature a competition among multiple artists and songs in order to select Estonia's entry for the Eurovision Song Contest. The Eurolaul competition has been organised since 1996 in order to select Estonia's entry and on 8 November 2002, ETV announced the organisation of Eurolaul 2003 in order to select the nation's 2003 entry.

Before Eurovision

Eurolaul 2003 
Eurolaul 2003 was the tenth edition of the Estonian national selection Eurolaul, which selected Estonia's entry for the Eurovision Song Contest 2003. The competition consisted of a ten-song final on 8 February 2003 at the ETV studios in Tallinn, hosted by Marko Reikop and Romi Erlach and broadcast on ETV. The national final was watched by 343,500 viewers in Estonia with a market share of 57.4%.

Competing entries 
On 8 November 2002, ETV opened the submission period for artists and composers to submit their entries up until 9 December 2002. A record 100 submissions were received by the deadline—breaking the previous record of 90, set during the 2002 edition. A 10-member jury panel selected 10 finalists from the submissions and the selected songs were announced on 13 December 2002. Among the competing artists was previous Eurovision Song Contest entrant Koit Toome, who represented Estonia in 1998. Kaire Vilgats (member of Family), Kadi Toom, Maarja Kivi (member of Vanilla Ninja), Maiken and Nightlight Duo have all competed in previous editions of Eurolaul. The selection jury consisted of Jaak Joala (musician), Meelis Kapstas (journalist), Ivo Linna (singer), Jaan Karp (musician), Priit Hõbemägi (culture critic), Tõnu Kõrvits (composer), Eda-Ines Etti (singer), Ignar Fjuk (architect), Karmel Eikner (journalist) and Tiit Kikas (musician).

Final 
The final took place on 8 February 2003. Ten songs competed during the show and "Eighties Coming Back" performed by Claire's Birthday was selected as the winner by an international jury. A non-competitive public televote which registered 77,729 votes was also held and selected "Club Kung-Fu" performed by Vanilla Ninja as the winner. The international jury panel consisted of Anders Berglund (Sweden), Sergio (Belgium), Darja Švajger (Slovenia), Manfred Witt (Germany), Moshe Datz (Israel), Renārs Kaupers (Latvia), Michael Ball (United Kingdom) and Bo Halldórsson (Iceland).

At Eurovision
According to Eurovision rules, all nations with the exceptions of the bottom five countries in the 2002 contest competed in the final on 24 May 2003. On 29 November 2002, a special allocation draw was held which determined the running order and Estonia was set to perform in position 23, following the entry from Belgium and before the entry from Romania. The band performed at the contest under the new name Ruffus and Estonia finished in twenty-first place with 14 points.

The show was broadcast in Estonia on ETV with commentary by Marko Reikop as well as via radio on Raadio 2 with commentary by Vello Rand. The Estonian spokesperson, who announced the Estonian votes during the show, was Ines who had previously represented Estonia in the Eurovision Song Contest in 2000.

Voting

References

2003
Countries in the Eurovision Song Contest 2003
Eurovision